Latvian Independent Television (LNT) was a major private television company in Latvia, founded in 1996. LNT featured TV series, news and entertainment programmes, airing 24 hours a day in Latvian. It went off the air on March 1, 2020, and was replaced by TV3 Life.

It was the most viewed TV channel in Latvia in 2005 with 21.1% of the market share, while in 2014 it ranked 4th with 9.1% behind TV3 Latvia, First Baltic Channel Latvia and LTV1.

History
The predecessors of LNT were the first private Latvian TV station - news channel NTV-5 launched on 4 May 1992, and the morning television channel PICCA TV which was launched in 1994 by entrepreneur Andrejs Ēķis. Both companies merged into LNT in autumn of 1996. The new station positioned itself as a challenger to the then-monopoly in Latvia of the state broadcaster Latvian Television and declared itself as the "first nationwide, family entertainment channel", broadcasting locally produced news programs and imported films and entertainment, which at the represented 40% of the airtime.

In the beginning, most of the private programming was acquired from Russian media companies, but by 2002 it was reported that the company had made deals with Western companies such as Paramount, Warner Brothers and BBC.

On 9 January 2012 it was announced that the channel would be bought by the media conglomerate Modern Times Group together with the Russian language channel TV5 and the Latvian Music Channel (now: Channel 2) for an undisclosed sum. The move was later approved by the Council of Competitiveness of Latvia on the condition that TV3, which MTG already owned, and LNT would retain independent news boards for at least five years.

Since October 2017 the channel was a part of All Media Baltics, a company owned by investment firm Providence Equity Partners. LNT, as with other channels of the All Media Baltics group in the Baltic states, switched to HD broadcasting on 26 July 2018.

On November 8, 2019, it was announced that the channel LNT would be replaced by a new channel for women named TV3 Life, a sister channel of TV3. On December 1, 2019, the very last edition of LNT News aired.
On January 1, 2020, LNT had new idents. On March 1, 2020, LNT was replaced with TV3 Life.

Achievements 
In 2007, the channel LNT took the first place in the list of the most loved brands in Latvia in the television category, and the sixth place in the list of brands of all industries.

In 2008, Haralds Burkovskis, the host of the LNT channel's "LNT Top 10" and "Made in Latvia" programs, received the Cicero Award for excellence in journalism. The morning program "900 seconds" produced by "LNT News Service" received an award from the National Radio and Television Council as the best television program of the year. In the "European Hit Radio" nomination, the "Best advertisement of the year – media" award was won by the radio advertisement "Sveša jīva" created by the LNT TV series.

On April 20, 2009, LNT channel was presented with the "Zelta vilnis" awards in the following nominations: "News program of the year" - LNT program 900 seconds, "Documentary program of the year" – LNT program at Degpunkt, "Special edition of the year" – LNT program Goodness Day, "Gada producer" – LNT creative director Niks Vollmars, "Television face of the year" – LNT program and TV show host Māris Grigalis, "Musical show of the year" – LNT show Singing families, "Translation of the year" winner of the Young Wave 2009 competition coverage on LNT and TV5 channel, "Television face of the year" – LNT project manager Lauris Reiniks, "Lifestyle program of the year" – LNT program in Sirma edienkarate.

On May 4, 2009, Katrīne Pasternak, the host of LNT's charity actions "Kindness Day" and "Angels over Latvia", received the Order of Three Stars. In the "Password 2009" social category, the LNT charity campaign "Angels over Latvia" won.

On March 22, 2010, "Zelta vilnis" awards were presented to LNT channel in the following nominations: "News program of the year" – LNT program 900 seconds, "Entertainment show of the year" – LNT show Latvian Golden Talents 2010, "Producer of the Year" – LNT project Goodness Day , Ilze Ancāne, producer of the Singing Family of Latvia and Voice of the Nation, "Life style program of the year" – LNT program Housing Question, "15 minutes of glory of the year" - Kaspars Zlidnis and Latvian Street gymnasts LNT Latvian Golden Talents.

The LNT channel received the Cicero Award of the Latvian Academy of Sciences for the project "Kindness Day".

See also

 Television in Latvia

References

Television in Latvia
Companies based in Riga
Television channels and stations established in 1996
Television channels and stations disestablished in 2020
Modern Times Group
1996 establishments in Latvia
2020 disestablishments in Latvia
Defunct television channels
All Media Baltics
Defunct mass media in Latvia